This is a list of universities in Yemen.

Public universities 

 Aden University
 Amran University of Technology
 Dhamar University
 Hadhramout University
 Higher Institute for Inspection & Guidance
 Hodeidah University
 Ibb University
 Sana'a University
 Sa'ada University
 Taiz University

Private universities and colleges 
 Al-Ahgaff University
 Al-Andalous University for Technical Sciences
 Al-Eman University
 Al-Nasser University
 Arab Academics University for Science and Technology - Yemen 
 British University in Yemen
 Future University - Yemen
 High College of Holly Quran
 International University of Technology Twintech - Yemen
 Ittehad University Yemen
 Lebanese International University
 Legal Sciences University
 Limkokwing University of Creative Technology - Yemen
 National University Yemen
 Queen Arwa University
 Sabaa University
 Universal University
 University of Islamic and Practical Sciences
 University of Modern Sciences
 University of Sciences and Technology
 Yemeni University

References

 
Universities
Yemen
Yemen